Marian I Needham (born 1941), is a female former athlete who competed for England.

Athletics career
She represented England in the long jump at the 1958 British Empire and Commonwealth Games in Cardiff, Wales.

References

1941 births
English female long jumpers
Athletes (track and field) at the 1958 British Empire and Commonwealth Games
Living people
Commonwealth Games competitors for England